The 13147 / 48 – Uttar Banga Express is an Express train belonging to Indian Railways – Eastern Railway zone that runs between Sealdah & Bamanhat via Siliguri in India. Uttar Banga Express was one of the two trains involved in the famous Sainthia train collision at Sainthia, West Bengal.

It operates as train number 13147 from Sealdah to Bamanhat and as train number 13148 in the reverse direction, serving the state of West Bengal. Uttar Banga translates to North Bengal in Bengali language.

Coaches

The 13147 / 48 Sealdah–Bamanhat Uttar Banga Express presently has 1 HA1 AC 1/2 tier, 1 AC 2 tier, 3 AC 3 tier, 9 Sleeper class, 3 General Unreserved & 2 SLR (Seating cum Luggage Rake) coaches. It does not have a pantry car.

As is customary with most train services in India, coach composition may be amended at the discretion of Indian Railways depending on demand.

Service

The 13147 Sealdah–Bamanhat Uttar Banga Express covers the distance of 693 kilometres in 13 hours 50 mins & in 13 hours 45 mins as 13148 Bamanhat–Sealdah Uttar Banga Express.

Earlier it was known as North Bengal Express.

Routeing

The 13147 / 48 Sealdah–Bamanhat Uttar Banga Express runs from
 Sealdah (Kolkata) via
 
 Guskara railway station
 Bolpur Shantiniketan railway station
 Ahmadpur Junction railway station
 
 Rampurhat Junction
 Nalhati Junction railway station
 Pakur railway station
 New Farakka Junction
 
 Samsi railway station
 Kumedpur Junction railway station
 Barsoi Junction railway station
 Dalkhola railway station
 Kishanganj railway station
 Aluabari Road Junction railway station
 New Jalpaiguri (Siliguri)
Dhupguri railway station
 Falakata Railway Station
  
 Dewanhat Railway Station
 Dinhata Railway Station to
 Bamanhat railway station.

Traction

It is now hauled by Electric Loco Shed, Howrah-based WAP-5/WAP-4 from Sealdah up to New Cooch Behar after which a Diesel Loco Shed, Siliguri-based WDP-4 takes the train towards Bamanhat

Timings

13147 Sealdah–Bamanhat Uttar Banga Express leaves Sealdah on a daily basis at 19:35 hrs IST and reaches Bamanhat at 11:30 hrs IST the next day.
13148 Bamanhat–Sealdah Uttar Banga Express leaves Bamanhat on a daily basis at 13:15 hrs IST and reaches Sealdah at 05:15 hrs IST the next day.

Coach composition
The coach composition of the 15007 train is:

 1 AC II Tier
 1 AC III Tier
 10 Sleeper coaches
 6 General
 2 Second-class Luggage/parcel van

Other trains on the Kolkata–New Jalpaiguri sector
 22301/02 Howrah–New Jalpaiguri Vande Bharat Express
 12041/42 New Jalpaiguri–Howrah Shatabdi Express
 22309/40 Howrah–New Jalpaiguri AC Express
 13149/50 Sealdah Alipurduar Kanchan Kanya Express
 12377/78 Sealdah New Alipurduar Padatik Superfast Express
 12344/45 Sealdah New Jalpaiguri Superfast Darjeeling Mail
 15959/60 Dibrugarh Howrah Kamrup Express
 13175/76 Sealdah Silchar/Agartala Kanchanjunga Express
 12345/46 Howrah Guwahati Saraighat Super-fast Express
 15722/23 New Jalpaiguri-Digha Express
 12518/19 Kolkata Guwahati Garib Rath Express
 12526/27 Dibrugarh–Kolkata Superfast Express
 13141/42 Sealdah New Alipurduar Teesta Torsha Express
 13147/58 Uttar Banga Express
 12503/04 Bangalore Humsafar Express
 13181/82 Kolkata–Silghat Town Kaziranga Express
 22511/12 Lokmanya Tilak Terminus–Kamakhya Karmabhoomi Express
 12526/27 Dibrugarh–Kolkata Superfast Express
 15644/45 Puri–Kamakhya Weekly Express (via Howrah)
 12364/65 Kolkata–Haldibari Intercity Express
 12509/10 Guwahati–Bengaluru Cantt. Superfast Express
 12507/08 Thiruvananthapuram–Silchar Superfast Express
 12514/15 Guwahati–Secunderabad Express

References

External links

Transport in Kolkata
Transport in Cooch Behar
Railway services introduced in 2000
Named passenger trains of India
Rail transport in West Bengal
Express trains in India